The European Para Championships is a multi-sport event contested by para-athletes from European nations. The championships have been awarded the status of regional games by the European Paralympic Committee and  offer qualification opportunities for the Paralympic Games.

Editions
The championships are held on a four-year cycle, taking place in the year proceeding the Summer Paralympic Games. The first edition of the championships will be held in August 2023 in Rotterdam, Netherlands.

Sports
The sports contested at the European Para Championships are; Archery, Badminton, Boccia, Cycling, Goalball, Judo, Shooting, Taekwondo, Wheelchair basketball, Wheelchair tennis.

See also
European Para Youth Games
World Para Athletics European Championships
European Games
European Championships (multi-sport event)
Paralympic Games
African Para Games
Asian Para Games
Parapan American Games

References

External links
European Para Championships
European Para Championships on Facebook
European Para Championships on Twitter

European Para Championships
 
Disabled multi-sport events
Multi-sport events in Europe
Multi-sport events